Warren Lincoln Travis (February 21, 1876 – July 12, 1941) was the first famous strongman in the United States of America and a world champion back and hip lifter, who performed feats of strength on Coney Island in the first quarter of the 20th century.

Feats of strength

Travis was born in Brooklyn as Roland Morgan on February 21, 1876. He was an adopted child and turned professional weightlifter at age 21. He weighed only around at his prime. In 1906, he was awarded the "World's Greatest Weightlifter" by a popular strength publication and received a jewel-studded belt.

His favourite lifts were the Heavy Lifts, such as the Harness Lift and the Back Lift, and Finger Lifts. In front of witnesses, he lifted in the Harness Lift and in the Back Lift. In 1907, he lifted  with one finger.

Travis was a successful as a businessman and became very wealthy. For 55 years, he held the record for total poundage lifted, that is, lifts done for repetitions, where the lifter may choose any lift and rep/set scheme, to lift the most weight within a given time frame. The standard for this record was initially set by Travis in 1927, when he Back Lifted 5.5 million pounds (2.5 million kg) in 3 hours, 9 minutes. His record was broken in 1982 by Howard Prechtel, who Back Lifted  in 3 hours, 9 minutes.

Loss of unofficial strongman title
Travis was defeated by John B. Gagnon for the unofficial title of "The World’s Strongest Man" in 1923. On Feb. 13, 1923, Gagnon competed against Travis in a test of strength. Travis, confident he could prevail over the Gagnon accepted the challenge and, in fact, before the contest, posted a $5,000 challenge "for anyone who will follow me in my stunts."

The contest took place at the city hall in Augusta, Maine. Gagnon opened the show by bending a sixty-penny spike double with his hands. Next, he placed a 5/8-inch iron bar between his teeth and bent it in an arc. Then Gagnon held two horseshoes upright in one hand, forming a “W”, and then asked for eight strong members of the audience to try to pull the steel shoes apart, but they could not.

Whenever Travis demonstrated a lift, Gagnon countered with a heavier one. Travis withdrew from any further lifts and was defeated.

Travis challenged Gagnon to a return match in New York. The prize was to be Travis's diamond belt and title of "World’s Strongest Man."  Gagnon's manager tried several times to schedule the rematch, but one never occurred.

Travis continued to lift heavy weights until his death on July 12, 1941, at the age of 65. He died during one of his performances of a heart attack at Luna Park on Coney Island.

"Challenge to the World"
Travis left a "Challenge to the World" in his will. It was an open challenge to anyone who could duplicate or exceed his lifting accomplishments. The first person to do this would receive his prized jewel-studded belt. Listed below is the challenge Travis claimed he could do.

 Take a  barbell from the floor with both hands, and press it overhead 10 times while seated (must be done in 30 seconds)
 Take a pair of  dumbbells from the side of the body to the shoulders, and press it to arms length overhead.
 Teeth lift from the floor, hands behind neck, 350 pounds.
 Finger Lift from the floor  with one finger, eight times in five seconds.
 Finger lift from the floor  with one finger once.
 Two hand grip lift, straddling the weight, twenty times in ten seconds.
 Hand and Thigh Lift  once.
 Back Lift  once.
 Harness Lift  once.
 Back Lift , 250 times in seven minutes.

Travis’ rules stated that these lifts must all be done in 30 minutes and must be done for 10 straight years. No one has yet succeeded in the challenge.

Gallery

References

External links
http://www.usawa.com/Default.aspx?pageId=435231
http://www.sandowplus.co.uk/Videos/videos.htm
http://www.holesinmyshoes.com (the story of Jack Beers, one of Travis' pupils)

1876 births
1941 deaths
American strength athletes
American male weightlifters
People associated with physical culture
People from Brooklyn